Brackpool is a surname. Notable people with the surname include:

Alfred Brackpool (1857–1927), English cricketer
Keith Brackpool (born 1957), British-American investor and business executive